Sogn is a traditional district in Western Norway (Vestlandet). It is located in the county of Vestland, surrounding the Sognefjord, the largest/longest fjord in Norway. The district of Sogn consists of the municipalities of Aurland, Balestrand, Hyllestad, Høyanger, Gulen, Leikanger, Luster, Lærdal, Sogndal, Solund, Vik, and Årdal. The largest urban area in Sogn is the village of Sogndalsfjøra (in Sogndal municipality), with 3,455 residents. The second largest urban area is the village Øvre Årdal (in Årdal municipality), with 3,397 people (this village used to be the largest, but recently it was passed by Sogndalsfjøra).

The district of Sogn comprises the southern part of the former county Sogn og Fjordane. The districts of Sunnfjord and Nordfjord are the other two districts in the county.

Etymology

The name Sogn derived from the name of Sognefjord.
The name of the fjord is from the root of súga "to suck", referring to the strong tidal streams at the mouth of the fjord. 
An old name for the district is Sygnafylki. The first element in this name is the genitive of sygnir which means "people from Sogn" and the last element is fylki  "county".

History

{{Historical populations
|footnote = Source: Statistics Norway.
|shading = off
|1769|19366
|1951|41846  	
|1960|40558  	  	
|1970|40254  	  	  	
|1980|39689 	
|1990|38996  	
|2000|37841  	  	
|2010|36511 	  	  	
|2020|36232  	 	
|2030|36773  	  	
}}

Viking Age
Since early in the Viking Age, Sogn was a petty kingdom called Sygnafylki. Some notable Kings of Sogn were Harald Gullskjegg ("Goldbeard", father of Ragnhild, first wife of Halfdan the Black), Halfdan the Black, and Harald Fairhair.

1662-present
In 1662, Sogn fogderi was created as part of the Nordre Bergenhus amt (county). Sogn was further divided into Indre Sogn (Inner Sogn) and Ytre Sogn (Outer Sogn).Indre Sogn consisted of the inner half of the district which included the present day municipalities of Aurland, Leikanger, Luster, Lærdal, Sogndal, and Årdal. The village of Sogndalsfjøra was the administrative center.Ytre Sogn consisted of the present day municipalities of Balestrand, Gulen, Hyllestad, Høyanger, Solund, and Vik. The village of Høyanger was the administrative center.

In 1919, Nordre Bergenhus amt was renamed Sogn og Fjordane fylke''.

References

Districts of Vestland
Petty kingdoms of Norway